Hannelly Zulami Quintero Ledezma (born November 22, 1985, in Ocumare del Tuy) is a Venezuelan actress, model, TV presenter, and beauty queen. She won Miss World Venezuela 2007 and Miss Intercontinental 2009. She competed in the Miss World 2008 beauty pageant, on December 13 in Johannesburg, South Africa, and ranked as one of the top fifteen semifinalists.  Quintero also won the title of Miss World Americas.

Quintero, who stands 178 cm tall, competed in the national beauty pageant Miss Venezuela 2007, on September 13, 2007, and obtained the title of Miss World Venezuela.  She won the special awards of "Miss Photogenic" and "Miss Beauty."  She represented the state of Cojedes.

She also placed among the top 8 finalists in Reina Hispanoamericana 2007, held in Santa Cruz, Bolivia on October 26, 2007.  Quintero also won the Miss Intercontinental 2009 pageant in Minsk (Belarus), on September 27, 2009.

Quintero is the host of Somos Talento in Venevisión.

References

1985 births
Living people
People from Caracas
Miss Venezuela World winners
Miss World 2008 delegates
Venezuelan female models
Venezuelan television presenters
Venezuelan women television presenters